The 29000 Class is a type of four-car Diesel Multiple Unit operated by Iarnród Éireann (Irish Rail). The units were built in Spain by CAF in two batches between 2002 and 2005.

Description

Each set comprises two driving end cars (DM1 and DM2) and two intermediate cars (MDT and MT) They are capable of operation as two sets of their own class or in formations of up to 10 cars with either 2600 Class or 2800 Class DMUs. Each car is fitted with a 294 kW MAN traction engine and a Cummins generator engine, both mounted underfloor. They have a maximum permitted speed of 120 km/h (75 mph). Passenger capacity is 185 seated and 634 standing.

The original delivery of twenty sets were numbered 2901-2980. However, to avoid conflict with the existing numbering system of the NIR 3000 Class, all cars were renumbered e.g. set 2901-04 becoming 29101-401. The 2005 batch of nine sets are numbered 29021-29029.

The railcars were the first to be shipped with the new Commuter  branding rather than the "Arrow" branding  previously  used, and as such were the first Iarnród Éireann rolling stock (other than DART EMUs and Enterprise stock) not to feature the company's traditional orange and black livery, which was phased out from passenger service in 2006. The Commuter brand was also extended to the 2600, 2700 and 2800 Class railcars. It has since been replaced by the InterCity livery on these DMUs.

In 2014, a new all-over two-tone green livery was introduced for the class. This was applied to all vehicles in September 2022.

Deployment

They work most Northern Commuter, South Eastern Commuter and Western Commuter services. They have proven to be a very reliable unit despite operating a variety of demanding services including Dublin - Sligo services. They were largely returned to their intended Commuter services since deliveries of 22000 Class DMUs commenced in 2007, which displaced them from Sligo line workings in 2008, though there are still a few services to and from Rosslare Europort with the 29000 Class DMUs. However, they remained in their "Commuter" livery when working this long-distance line.

The November 2009 timetable change finally saw the end of the 29000s running West of Dublin from Heuston to Newbridge/Kildare and Carlow. The services have been operated by 22000 Class DMUs since 2009.

Fleet details 

All units are now in the Green Goddess livery.

Routes

Current services

InterCity
Dublin Connolly to Rosslare Europort 
Dublin Connolly to Belfast Lanyon Place (occasionally - sometimes a substitute for an Enterprise breakdown)
Dublin Connolly to Drogheda MacBride

Commuter
Dublin Pearse/Connolly/Docklands - M3 Parkway/Maynooth/Longford (Western Commuter)
Dublin Pearse/Connolly to Drogheda/Dundalk (Northern Commuter)

Former services

InterCity
Dublin Connolly to Sligo

Commuter
Dublin Heuston to Newbridge/Kildare

In popular culture 
A 29000 Class unit features in the intro to RTÉ’s Fair City.

Accidents and incidents
On Monday 16 November 2009, unit 29026 was derailed near  when it collided with a landslip obstructing the line.
On Tuesday 7 June 2016, one unidentified unit caught fire whilst operating the 09:40 Drogheda to Dublin Pearse service.

See also
Multiple Units of Ireland
NIR 3000 Class

References

External links

Irish Rail Fleet Information website 

Iarnród Éireann multiple units
Train-related introductions in 2002
CAF multiple units